Peter Brodie may refer to:
Peter Bellinger Brodie (conveyancer) (1778–1854), English conveyancer
Peter Bellinger Brodie (1815–1897), English geologist
Peter Brodie (police officer) (1914–1989), British police officer
Peter Brodie (minister) (1916–1996), Church of Scotland minister and moderator of the General Assembly of the Church of Scotland